Local loop unbundling (LLU or LLUB) is the regulatory process of allowing multiple telecommunications operators to use connections from the telephone exchange to the customer's premises. The physical wire connection between the local exchange and the customer is known as a "local loop", and is owned by the incumbent local exchange carrier (also referred to as the "ILEC", "local exchange", or in the United States either a "Baby Bell" or an independent telephone company). To increase competition, other providers are granted unbundled access.

Policy background

LLU is generally opposed by the ILECs, which in most cases are either former investor-owned (North America) or state-owned monopoly enterprises forced to open themselves to competition. ILECs argue that LLU amounts to a regulatory taking, that they are forced to provide competitors with essential business inputs, that LLU stifles infrastructure-based competition and technical innovation because new entrants prefer to 'parasitise' the incumbent's network instead of building their own and that the regulatory interference required to make LLU work (e.g., to set the LLU access price) is detrimental to the market.

New entrants, on the other hand, argue that since they cannot economically duplicate the incumbent's local loop, they cannot actually provide certain services, such as ADSL without LLU, thus allowing the incumbent to monopolise the respective potentially competitive market(s) and stifle innovation. They point out that alternative access technologies, such as wireless local loop, have proven uncompetitive and/or impractical, and that under current pricing models, the incumbent is in many cases, depending on the regulatory model, guaranteed a fair price for the use of its facilities, including an appropriate return on investment. Finally, they argue that the ILECs generally did not construct their local loop in a competitive, risky, market environment, but under legal monopoly protection and using taxpayer's money, which means, according to the new entrants, that ILECs ought not to be entitled to continue to extract regulated rates of return, which often include monopoly rents from the local loop.

Most industrially developed nations, including the US, Australia, the European Union member states, and India have introduced regulatory frameworks providing for LLU. Given the above-mentioned problems, regulators face the challenging task of regulating a market that is changing very rapidly, without stifling any type of innovation, and without improperly disadvantaging any competitor.

The process has been long - the first action in the EU resulted from a report written for the European Commission in 1993.  It took several years for the EU legislation to require unbundling and then in individual EU countries the process took further time to mature to become practical and economic rather than simply being a legal possibility.

In 1996 the United States Telecommunication Act (in section 251) defined the unbundled access as: 

The 1993 report referred to the logical requirement to unbundle optical fibre access but recommended deferral to a later date when fibre access had become more common.  In 2006 there were the first signs that (as a result of the municipal fibre networks movement and example such as Sweden where unbundled local loop fibre is commercially available from both the incumbent and competitors) policy may yet evolve in this direction.

Unbundling developments around the world

World Trade Organisation
Some provisions of WTO telecommunications law can be read to require unbundling:
 Sect. 5(a) of the GATS Annex on Telecommunications requires WTO Members to guarantee service suppliers "access to and use of public telecommunications transport networks ... for the supply of a service". New entrants argue that without LLU they cannot supply services such as ADSL.
 Sect. 2.2(b) of the 1998 Reference Paper, to which some Members have subscribed, requires "sufficiently unbundled interconnection" with major providers. However, the Paper's definition of interconnection appears to exclude LLU.
 Sect. 1 of the Reference Paper requires Members to maintain "appropriate measures ... for the purpose of preventing [major] suppliers ... from engaging in or continuing anti-competitive practices." New entrants argue that such practices include not giving competitors access to facilities essential to market entry, such as the local loop.

The question has not been settled before a WTO judicial body, and, at any rate, these obligations only apply where the respective WTO Member has committed itself to open its basic telecommunications market to competition. About 80 (mostly developed) Members have done so since 1998.

India

LLU has not been implemented in Indian cities yet. However, BSNL recently stated that it will open up its copper loops for private participation. In addition to this, the proliferation of WiMax and cable broadband has increased broadband penetration and market competition. By 2008 the price war had reduced basic broadband prices to INR 250 (US$6), including line rental without any long-term contracts. In rural areas, the state player, BSNL, is still the leading, and often the only supplier.
Although BSNL is a monopoly, it is used as a tool to ensure competition by the government.

European Union

The implementation of local loop unbundling is a requirement of European Union policy on competition in the telecommunications sector and has been introduced, at various stages of development, in all member states (Operators with Significant Market Power shall publish (from 31 December 2000, and keep updated) a postreference offer for unbundled access to their local loops and related facilities. The offer shall be sufficiently unbundled so that the beneficiary does not have to pay for network elements or facilities which are not necessary for the supply of its services, and shall contain a description of the components of the offer, associated terms and conditions, including charges).

European States that have been approved for membership to the EU have an obligation to introduce LLU as part of the liberalisation of their communications sector.

United Kingdom

By 14 January 2006, 210,000 local loop connections had been unbundled from BT operation under local loop unbundling. Ofcom had hoped that 1 million local loop connections would be unbundled by June 2006. However, as reported by The Register on 15 June 2006, the figure had reached only 500,000, but was growing by 20,000 a week. Ofcom announced in November 2006 that 1,000,000 connections had been unbundled. By April 2007, the figure was 2,000,000.

By June 2006, AOL UK had unbundled 100,000 lines through its £120 million investment, making it the largest single LLU operator in the UK market.

On 10 October 2006, Carphone Warehouse announced the purchase of AOL UK, the leading LLU operator, for £370m. This made Carphone Warehouse the third largest broadband provider and the largest LLU operator with more than 150,000 LLU customers.

On 8 May 2009, TalkTalk, who were owned by Carphone Warehouse, announced that they would purchase ailing Tiscali UK's assets for £235 million. On 30 June 2009, Tiscali sold its UK subsidiary to Carphone Warehouse following regulatory approval from the European Union. This purchase made TalkTalk the biggest home broadband supplier in the UK, with 4.25 million home broadband subscribers, compared with BT's 3.9 million. The service was rebranded as TalkTalk in January 2010.

Most LLU operators only unbundle the broadband service leaving the traditional telephone service using BT's core equipment (with or without the provision of carrier preselect). Where the traditional telephone service is also unbundled (full LLU), operators usually prohibit the facility where selected calls can be made using the networks of other telephone providers (i.e. accessed using a three- to five-digit prefix beginning with '1'). These calls can usually still be made by using an 0800 or other non-geographic (NGN) access code.

Although regulators in the UK admitted that the market could provide competitive offerings in due time, the purpose of mandatory local loop unbundling in the United Kingdom was to speed the delivery of advanced services to consumers.

United States
Pursuant to the Telecommunications Act of 1996, the Federal Communications Commission (FCC) requires that ILECs lease local loops to competitors (CLECs). Prices are set through a market mechanism.

New Zealand
The Commerce Commission recommended against local loop unbundling in late 2003 as Telecom New Zealand (now Spark New Zealand) offered a market-led solution. In May 2004 this was confirmed by the Government, despite the intense "call4change" campaign by some of Telecom's competitors. Part of Telecom's commitment to the Commerce Commission to avoid unbundling was a promise to deliver 250,000 new residential broadband connections by the end of 2005, one-third of which were to be wholesaled through other providers. Telecom failed to achieve the number of wholesale connections required, despite an attempt by management to claim that the agreement had been for only one-third of the growth rather than one-third of the total. That claim was rejected by the Commerce Commission, and the publicised figure of 83,333 wholesale connections out of 250,000 was held to be the true target. The achieved number was less than 50,000 wholesale connections, despite total connections exceeding 300,000.

On 3 May 2006 the Government announced it would require the unbundling of the local loop. This was in response to concerns about the low levels of broadband uptake. Regulatory action such as information disclosure, the separate accounting of Telecom New Zealand business operations, and enhanced Commerce Commission monitoring was announced.

On 9 August 2007 Telecom released the keys to exchanges in Glenfield and Ponsonby in Auckland. In March 2008 Telecom activated ADSL 2+ services from five Auckland exchanges – Glenfield, Browns Bay, Ellerslie, Mt Albert and Ponsonby – with further plans for the rest of Auckland and other major centres, allowing other ISPs to take advantage.

Switzerland

Switzerland is one of the last OECD nations to provide for unbundling, because the Swiss Federal Supreme Court held in 2001 that the 1996 Swiss Telecommunications Act did not require it. The government then enacted an ordinance providing for unbundling in 2003, and Parliament amended the act in 2006. While infrastructure-based access is now generally available, unbundled fast bitstream access is limited to a period of four years after the entry into force of the act.

Unbundling requests tend to be tied up before the courts, however, because unlike in the EU, Swiss law does not provide for an ex ante regulation of access conditions by the regulator. Instead, under the Swiss ex post regulation system, each new entrant must first try to reach an individual agreement with Swisscom, the state-owned ILEC.

Hong Kong
Mandatory local loop unbundling policy (termed Type II Interconnection (Traditional Chinese:第二類互連) in Hong Kong) started on July 1, 1995 (the same day of telephone market liberalisation), to ensure choice to customers. After 10 years, new operators have built their networks covering a large region of Hong Kong; the government considered it a good time to withdraw mandatory local loop unbundling policy, to persuade operators to build their own networks and let businesses run themselves with a minimum of government intervention. At the meeting of the Executive Council on 6 July 2004, the government decided that the regulatory intervention under the current Type II interconnection policy applicable to telephone exchanges for individual buildings covered by such exchanges should be withdrawn, subject to conditions documented in a statement by the Telecommunications Authority. After that, the terms of interconnection will be negotiated between telephone operators. Hong Kong is the only advanced economy that has withdrawn the mandatory local loop unbundling policy.

South Africa
On 25 May 2006 the Minister of Communications of South Africa Dr Ivy Matsepe-Casaburri established the Local Loop Unbundling Committee chaired by Professor Tshilidzi Marwala to recommend the appropriate local loop unbundling models. The Local Loop Unbundling Committee submitted a report to Minister Matsepe-Casaburri on 25 May 2007. This report recommends that models that permit customers to access both voice and data be offered by many different companies. The models recommended are Full Unbundling, Line Sharing and Bitstream Access. It is recommended that customers should exercise carrier pre-selection and thus be able to switch between service providers. It is also recommended that an organisation be created to manage the local loop and that this organisation should be under the guidance of the regulator Icasa and that Icasa be capacitated in terms of resources. The committee recommended that service providers approved by Icasa should have access to the telephone exchange infrastructure whenever necessary. The committee recommended that a regulatory guideline be established and be managed by Icasa to guarantee that strategic issues like quality of the local loop be optimised for regulation and delivery of services. Based on this report the Minister has issued policy directives to Icasa to move swiftly with the unbundling process. At the end of March 2010 nothing has happened yet, however a deadline of November 1, 2011 was set by the Minister of Communications for monopoly holder, Telkom SA to finalise the unbundling process.

See also
Forced-access regulation
Local number portability
Loop management system
Mobile number portability
Product bundling
Sub-loop unbundling
Unbundling in France (in French)

References

Further reading
 OECD, Universal Service and Rate Restructuring in Telecommunications, Organisation for Economic Co-operation and Development (OECD) Publishing, 1991.

External links
 OECD, Developments in Local Loop Unbundling
 LLU Exchange List
 EU telecommunications liberalization framework
 Local Loop Unbundling - What is it?
 LLU Availability
 MAC Codes - UK Guide for obtaining your MAC code

Local loop
Broadband
Telecommunications economics